Đồng Phúc may refer to:

Đồng Phúc, Bac Giang, Vietnam
Đồng Phúc, Bac Kan, Vietnam